In the late 1950s and early 1960s, the use of thalidomide in 46 countries by women who were pregnant or who subsequently became pregnant resulted in the "biggest man-made medical disaster ever," with more than 10,000 children born with a range of severe deformities, such as phocomelia, as well as thousands of miscarriages.

Thalidomide was introduced in 1953 as a tranquilizer, and was later marketed by the German pharmaceutical company Chemie Grünenthal under the trade name Contergan as a medication for anxiety, trouble sleeping, tension, and morning sickness. It was introduced as a sedative and medication for morning sickness without having been tested on pregnant women. While initially deemed to be safe in pregnancy, concerns regarding birth defects were noted in 1961, and the medication was removed from the market in Europe that year.

Development of thalidomide

Thalidomide was first developed as a tranquilizer by Swiss pharmaceutical company Ciba in 1953.
In 1954, Ciba abandoned the product, and it was acquired by German pharmaceutical company Chemie Grünenthal. The company had been established by Hermann Wirtz, Sr, a Nazi Party member, after World War II as a subsidiary of the family's Mäurer & Wirtz company. The company's initial aim was to develop antibiotics for which there was an urgent market need. Wirtz appointed chemist Heinrich Mückter, who had escaped prosecution for war crimes for his experiments on prisoners of Nazi concentration camps, to head the development programme because of his experience researching and producing an anti-typhus vaccine for Nazi Germany. He hired Martin Staemmler, a medical doctor and leading proponent of the Nazi eugenics programme, as head of pathology, as well as Heinz Baumkötter, the chief medical officer at the Sachsenhausen concentration camp, and Otto Ambros, a chemist and Nazi war criminal. Ambros was the chairman of Grünenthal's advisory committee during the development of thalidomide and was a board member when Contergan was being sold.

Birth defect crisis
The total number of people affected by the use of thalidomide during pregnancy is estimated at more than 10,000, of whom approximately 40 percent died at or shortly after the time of birth. Those who survived had limb, eye, urinary tract, and heart defects. Its initial entry into the U.S. market was prevented by Frances Oldham Kelsey at the U.S. Food and Drug Administration (FDA). The birth defects of thalidomide led to the development of greater drug regulation and monitoring in many countries.

The severity and location of the deformities depended on how many days into the pregnancy the mother was before beginning treatment; thalidomide taken on the 20th day of pregnancy caused central brain damage, day 21 would damage the eyes, day 22 the ears and face, day 24 the arms, and leg damage would occur if taken up to day 28. Thalidomide did not damage the fetus if taken after 42 days' gestation.

It is not known exactly how many worldwide victims of thalidomide embryopathy there have been, although estimates range from 10,000 to 20,000.

United Kingdom

In the UK, the drug was licensed in 1958 and withdrawn in 1961. Of the approximately 2,000 babies born with defects, around half died within a few months and 466 survived to at least 2010. In 1968, after a long campaign by The Sunday Times, a compensation settlement for the UK victims was reached with Distillers Company (now part of Diageo), which had distributed the drug in the UK. Distillers Biochemicals paid out approximately £28m in compensation following a legal battle.

The British Thalidomide Children's Trust was set up in 1973 as part of a £20 million legal settlement between Distillers Company and 429 children with thalidomide-related disabilities. In 1997, Diageo (formed by a merger between Grand Metropolitan and Guinness, who had taken over Distillers in 1990) made a long-term financial commitment to support the Thalidomide Trust and its beneficiaries. The UK government gave survivors a grant of £20 million, to be distributed through the Thalidomide Trust, in December 2009.

Spain
In Spain, thalidomide was widely available throughout the 1970s, and perhaps even into the 1980s. There were two reasons for this. First, state controls and safeguarding were poor; it was not until 2008 that the government even admitted the country had ever imported thalidomide. The Spanish advocacy group for victims of thalidomide estimates that in 2015, there were 250–300 living victims of thalidomide in Spain.

Australia and New Zealand
Although the Australian obstetrician William McBride took credit for raising concern about thalidomide, it was a midwife called Sister Pat Sparrow who first suspected the drug was causing birth defects in the babies of patients under McBride's care at Crown Street Women's Hospital in Sydney. German paediatrician Widukind Lenz, who also suspected the link, is credited with conducting the scientific research that proved thalidomide was causing birth defects in 1961. McBride was later awarded a number of honors, including a medal and prize money by L'Institut de la Vie in Paris, but he was eventually struck off the Australian medical register in 1993 for scientific fraud related to work on Debendox. Further animal tests were conducted by George Somers, Chief Pharmacologist of Distillers Company in Britain, which showed foetal abnormalities in rabbits. Similar results were also published showing these effects in rats and other species.

Melbourne woman Lynette Rowe, who was born without limbs, led an Australian class action lawsuit against the drug's manufacturer, Grünenthal, which fought to have the case heard in Germany. The Supreme Court of Victoria dismissed Grünenthal's application in 2012, and the case was heard in Australia. On 17 July 2012, Rowe was awarded an out-of-court settlement, believed to be in the millions of dollars and providing precedence for class action victims to receive further compensation. In February 2014, the Supreme Court of Victoria endorsed the settlement of $89 million AUD to 107 victims of the drug in Australia and New Zealand.

Germany
In East Germany, thalidomide was rejected by the Central Committee of Experts for the Drug Traffic in the GDR, and was never approved for use. There are no known thalidomide babies born in East Germany. Meanwhile, in West Germany, it took some time before the increase in dysmelia at the end of the 1950s was connected with thalidomide. In 1958, Karl Beck, a former pediatric doctor in Bayreuth, wrote an article in a local newspaper claiming a relationship between nuclear weapons testing and cases of dysmelia in children. Based on this, FDP whip Erich Mende requested an official statement from the federal government. For statistical reasons, the main data series used to research dysmelia cases started by chance at the same time as the approval date for thalidomide. After the Nazi regime with its Law for the Prevention of Hereditarily Diseased Offspring used mandatory statistical monitoring to commit various crimes, western Germany had been very reluctant to monitor congenital disorders in a similarly strict way. The parliamentary report rejected any relation with radioactivity and the abnormal increase of dysmelia. Also the DFG research project installed after the Mende request was not helpful. The project was led by pathologist Franz Büchner, who ran the project to propagate his teratological theory. Büchner saw lack of healthy nutrition and behavior of the mothers as being more important than genetic reasons. Furthermore, it took a while to appoint a Surgeon General in Germany; the Federal Ministry of Health was not founded until 1962, some months after thalidomide was banned from the market. In West Germany approximately 2,500 babies were born with birth defects from thalidomide.

Canada
Despite its severe side effects, thalidomide was sold in pharmacies in Canada until 1962. The effects of thalidomide increased fears regarding the safety of pharmaceutical drugs. The Society of Toxicology of Canada was formed after the effects of thalidomide were made public, focusing on toxicology as a discipline separate from pharmacology. The need for the testing and approval of the toxins in certain pharmaceutical drugs became more important after the disaster. The Society of Toxicology of Canada is responsible for the Conservation Environment Protection Act, focusing on researching the impact to human health of chemical substances. Thalidomide brought on changes in the way drugs are tested, what type of drugs are used during pregnancy, and increased the awareness of potential side effects of drugs.

According to Canadian news magazine programme W5, most, but not all, victims  of thalidomide receive annual benefits as compensation from the Government of Canada. Excluded are those who cannot provide the documentation the government requires.

A group of 120 Canadian survivors formed the Thalidomide Victims Association of Canada, the goal of which is to prevent the approval of drugs that could be harmful to pregnant women and babies. The members from the thalidomide victims association were involved in the STEPS programme, which aimed to prevent teratogenicity.

United States

In the U.S., the FDA refused approval to market thalidomide, saying further studies were needed. This reduced the impact of thalidomide in U.S. patients. The refusal was largely due to pharmacologist Frances Oldham Kelsey who withstood pressure from the Richardson-Merrell Pharmaceuticals Co. Although thalidomide was not approved for sale in the United States at the time, over 2.5 million tablets had been distributed to over 1,000 physicians during a clinical testing programme. It is estimated that nearly 20,000 patients, several hundred of whom were pregnant women, were given the drug to help alleviate morning sickness or as a sedative, and at least 17 children were consequently born in the United States with thalidomide-associated deformities. While pregnant, children's television host Sherri Finkbine took thalidomide that her husband had purchased over-the-counter in Europe. When she learned that thalidomide was causing fetal deformities she wanted to abort her pregnancy, but the laws of Arizona allowed abortion only if the mother's life was in danger. Finkbine traveled to Sweden to have the abortion. Thalidomide was found to have deformed the fetus.

For denying the application despite the pressure from Richardson-Merrell Pharmaceuticals Co., Kelsey eventually received the President's Award for Distinguished Federal Civilian Service at a 1962 ceremony with President John F. Kennedy. In September 2010, the FDA honored Kelsey with the first Kelsey award, given annually to an FDA staff member. This came 50 years after Kelsey, then a new medical officer at the agency, first reviewed the application from the William S. Merrell Pharmaceuticals Company of Cincinnati.

Cardiologist Helen B. Taussig learned of the damaging effects of the drug thalidomide on newborns and in 1967, testified before Congress on this matter after a trip to Germany where she worked with infants with phocomelia (severe limb deformities). As a result of her efforts, thalidomide was banned in the United States and Europe.

Austria
Ingeborg Eichler, a member of the Austrian pharmaceutical admission conference, enforced restrictions on the sale of thalidomide (tradename Softenon) under the rules of prescription medication and as a result relatively few affected children were born in Austria and Switzerland.

Aftermath of scandal

The numerous reports of malformations in babies brought about the awareness of the side effects of the drug on pregnant women. The birth defects caused by the drug thalidomide can range from moderate malformation to more severe forms. Possible birth defects include phocomelia, dysmelia, amelia, bone hypoplasticity, and other congenital defects affecting the ear, heart, or internal organs. Franks et al. looked at how the drug affected newborn babies, the severity of their deformities, and reviewed the drug in its early years. Webb in 1963 also reviewed the history of the drug and the different forms of birth defects it had caused. "The most common form of birth defects from thalidomide is shortened limbs, with the arms being more frequently affected. This syndrome is the presence of deformities of the long bones of the limbs resulting in shortening and other abnormalities."

Grünenthal criminal trial
In 1968, a large criminal trial began in Germany, charging several Grünenthal officials with negligent homicide and injury. After Grünenthal settled with the victims in April 1970, the trial ended in December 1970 with no finding of guilt. As part of the settlement, Grünenthal paid 100 million DM into a special foundation; the German government added 320 million DM. The foundation paid victims a one-time sum of 2,500–25,000 DM (depending on severity of disability) and a monthly stipend of 100–450 DM. The monthly stipends have since been raised substantially and are now paid entirely by the government (as the foundation had run out of money). Grünenthal paid another €50 million into the foundation in 2008.

On 31 August 2012, Grünenthal chief executive Harald F. Stock – who served as the chief executive officer of Grünenthal GmbH from January 2009 to May 28, 2013, and was also a Member of executive board until 28 May 2013 – apologised for the first time for producing the drug and remaining silent about the birth defects. At a ceremony, Stock unveiled a statue of a disabled child to symbolise those harmed by thalidomide and apologised for not trying to reach out to victims for over 50 years. At the time of the apology, there were between 5,000 and 6,000 people still living with Thalidomide-related birth defects. Victim advocates called the apology "insulting" and "too little, too late", and criticised the company for not compensating victims. They also criticised the company for their claim that no one could have known the harm the drug caused, arguing that there were plenty of red flags at the time.

Notable cases

 Mercédes Benegbi, born with phocomelia of both arms, drove the successful campaign for compensation from her government for Canadians who were affected by thalidomide.
 Mat Fraser, born with phocomelia of both arms, is an English rock musician, actor, writer and performance artist. He produced a 2002 television documentary, Born Freak, which looked at this historical tradition and its relevance to modern disabled performers. This work has become the subject of academic analysis in the field of disability studies.
 Niko von Glasow, a thalidomide survivor, produced a documentary called NoBody's Perfect, based on the lives of 12 people affected by the drug, which was released in 2008.
 Josée Lake is a Canadian Paralympic gold medallist swimmer, thalidomide survivor, and president of the Thalidomide Victims Association of Canada
 Lorraine Mercer MBE of the United Kingdom, born with phocomelia of both arms and legs, is the only thalidomide survivor to carry the Olympic Torch.
 Thomas Quasthoff, an internationally acclaimed bass-baritone, who describes himself: "1.34 meters tall, short arms, seven fingers — four right, three left — large, relatively well-formed head, brown eyes, distinctive lips; profession: singer".
 Alvin Law, Canadian motivational speaker and former radio broadcaster.

Change in drug regulations
The disaster prompted many countries to introduce tougher rules for the testing and licensing of drugs, such as the Kefauver Harris Amendment  (U.S.), Directive 65/65/EEC1 (E.U.), and the Medicines Act 1968 (UK). In the United States, the new regulations strengthened the FDA, among other ways, by requiring applicants to prove efficacy and to disclose all side effects encountered in testing. The FDA subsequently initiated the Drug Efficacy Study Implementation to reclassify drugs already on the market.

References

Further reading

External links 
 WHO Pharmaceuticals Newsletter No. 2, 2003 – See page 11, Feature Article
 CBC Digital Archives – Thalidomide: Bitter Pills, Broken Promises
 Remind me again, what is thalidomide and how did it cause so much harm?. The Conversation, 7 December 2015

Congenital amputations
Drug safety
20th-century health disasters
Health disasters in the United Kingdom
Leprosy
Medical controversies
Medical controversies in the United Kingdom
Medical controversies in Germany
Medical controversies in Austria
Medical controversies in Australia
Medical controversies in New Zealand
Medical controversies in the United States
Medical controversies in Canada
Medical scandals
Wikipedia medicine articles ready to translate
History of disability